Surcouf was a  of the French Navy. She was the fourth French ship named in honour of privateer and slave trader Robert Surcouf.

Design and construction
Laid down in February 1951 at Lorient and launched in October 1953, Surcouf was commissioned into the French Navy in 1955. She was the first of twelve T 47-class destroyers. Her armament consisted of six  guns which were mounted in three twin turrets, six  guns in twin mounts and four single-mounted  guns. There were four banks of three  torpedo tubes, capable of launching both anti-submarine homing and anti-ship torpedoes. The ship had a complement of 347 personnel.

Major modification 
In the early 1960s, Surcouf was converted to a command ship to become a flotilla leader. In order to install an operations centre and housings for an admiral and his staff, the forward 57 mm mount was removed (extending forward the bridge) and the two aft torpedo platforms were removed so that housing quarters could be constructed. The overhaul was conducted at the arsenal of Brest between 11 June 1960 (commencement of work) and 4 October 1961 (end of the tests).

Operational service
Following her commissioning in November 1955, Surcouf homeport was Toulon, being assigned to the First Destroyers Flotilla (1st FEE), at the head of the Fourth Destroyer Division (DEE4). In 1956 she alternated between naval exercises (including NATO's) and Algerian coastal surveillance. From October to December Surcouf took part in Operation Musketeer during the Suez Crisis.

On 10 April 1959 her assignment and homeport were changed. Surcouf was attached to the Tenth Destroyer Division (DEE10) of the Light Fleet (the Escadre légère) based at Brest. On 26 March 1960, Surcouf was involved in a collision with the cargo ship Léognan off Groix, suffering significant damage but no loss of life.

After her conversion into a flotilla leader (June 1960 – October 1961) Surcouf was assigned to the main fleet (the Escadre), based at Toulon, where she was the flagship of the admiral commanding the 1st FEE (ALFEE).

In March 1962, during the Battle of Bab El Oued, Surcouf was sent to shell the OAS-held Bab el-Oued quarter of Algiers along with her sister ship . After suggestions from the naval command, the bombardment was called off as impractical. The destroyers kept their station close to the shore as a deterrent. Along with three other destroyers, both vessels ferried troops to Algiers on 2 March to counter the OAS rebellion.

Final fate
Nine men from Surcouf were lost at sea and one was severely burned (he later died of his wounds). When the French destroyer  (which belonged to the same tactical group) attempted to tow the badly damaged ship, Surcouf snapped in two, the bow sinking quickly. The aft part was taken in tow to Toulon via Cartagena. Surcouf was eventually sunk as a target by an Exocet anti-ship missile after being decommissioned on 5 May 1972.

References

Citations

Bibliography

External links
 Surcouf shortly after the collision with General Busharov
 The aft part of Surcouf moored in Toulon

T 47-class destroyers
Cold War frigates of France
Ships built in France
1953 ships
Ships sunk as targets
Maritime incidents in 1960
Maritime incidents in 1971
Destroyers of the Cold War